Cleveland County is a county in the central part of the U.S. state of Oklahoma. The population was 295,528 at the 2020 United States Census, making it the third-most populous county in Oklahoma. Its county seat is Norman. The county was named for U.S. President Grover Cleveland.

Cleveland County is part of the Oklahoma City Metropolitan Statistical Area.

History

Originally occupied by the Quapaw tribe, the Quapaw ceded the area to the U.S. Government soon after the Louisiana Purchase in 1818. During the late 1820s and 1830s, the area was given to the Creek and Seminole tribes after their forced removal from the southeastern United States. An agreement between the two tribes resulted in this area being part of the Seminole Nation, located west of the Creek Nation.

In 1866, these tribes were forced to cede the area to the Federal Government; the professed rationale was their siding with the Confederacy during the American Civil War. The area became part of the Unassigned Lands and was opened for white settlement on April 22, 1889.

After the passage of the Organic Act in 1890, Cleveland County was organized as County 3 (of 7) and Norman became the county seat. For a short time, Cleveland County was known as Little River County, until an election in 1890. The voters selected the name Cleveland in honor of President Grover Cleveland over the name Lincoln.

Geography
It is the eighth smallest county in the state.

Cleveland County contains the reservoir Lake Thunderbird , constructed between 1962 and 1965. Its waters covered the previous settlement of Denver.

The Canadian River defines the southern border of Cleveland County.

Adjacent counties
 Oklahoma County − north
 Pottawatomie County − east
 McClain County − southwest
 Canadian County − northwest

Demographics

As of the 2010 United States Census, there were 255,755 people, 98,306 households, and 64,182 families in the county. The population density was 458 people per square mile (177/km²). There were 104,821 housing units at an average density of 188 per square mile (72.5/km²). The racial makeup of the county was 79.3% white, 4.2% black or African American, 4.7% Native American, 3.8% Asian, 0.1% Pacific Islander, 2.3% from other races, and 5.6% from two or more races. 7.0% of the population were Hispanic or Latino of any race.

There were 98,306 households, of which almost half (49.9%) included married couples living together and more than a third (34.7%) were non-families. Almost a third (32.9%) included children under the age of 18, 10.7% had a female householder with no husband present, and 4.7% had a male householder with no wife present. More than a fourth (25.9%) of households consisted of a sole individual and 6.9% were individuals 65 years of age or older living alone. The average household size was 2.49 and the average family size was 3.02.

The county population contained 23.1% under the age of 18, 14.2% from 18 to 24, 28.1% from 25 to 44, 24.4% from 45 to 64, and 10.2% who were 65 years of age or older. The median age was 32.7 years. For every 100 females, there were 99.9 males. For every 100 females age 18 and over, there were 98.1 males.

The median income for a household in the county was $53,759, and the median income for a family was $67,412. Males had a median income of $45,580 versus $34,801 for females. The per capita income for the county was $26,640. About 7.2% of families and 12.1% of the population were below the poverty line, including 12.7% of those under age 18 and 5.8% of those age 65 or over.

Politics
Cleveland County is rather conservative for a county influenced by a college town. While most such counties swung heavily to the Democrats in the 1990s, Cleveland County has gone Republican in all but one presidential election since 1952, and last went Democratic for president in 1964. This closely mirrors the growing Republican trend in Oklahoma as a whole.

Education
The University of Oklahoma is located in Norman. It is the largest university in Oklahoma with approximately 30,000 students.

K-12 school districts
School districts include:

 Lexington Public Schools
 Little Axe Public Schools
 McLoud Public Schools
 Midwest City-Del City Schools
 Moore Public Schools
 Mustang Public Schools
 Noble Public Schools
 Norman Public Schools
 Robin Hill Public School (elementary only)

Libraries
Pioneer Library System operates branch libraries in ten cities in Cleveland, McClain and Pottawatomie counties.

Transportation

Airports
The University of Oklahoma Westheimer Airport is owned by the University of Oklahoma.

Major highways

  Interstate 35
  Interstate 44
  U.S. Highway 62
  U.S. Highway 77
  State Highway 9
  State Highway 37
  State Highway 39
  State Highway 77H

US 77 James C. Nance Bridge between Lexington and Purcell
The US 77 James C. Nance Memorial Bridge linking Lexington and Purcell was originally built as a circa 1938 deck truss two-lane bridge and in 2019 rebuilt as a concrete pier four-lane bridge  crossing the Canadian River between Purcell and Lexington, Oklahoma. The bridge carries U.S. Route 77 (US-77) and Oklahoma State Highway 39 (SH-39) from McClain County to Cleveland County. The bridge is named for James C. Nance, longtime community newspaper chain publisher and Speaker of the Oklahoma House of Representatives, President Pro Tem of Oklahoma State Senate and Uniform Law Commissioner.

The Nance bridge allows travel time from Purcell (west side of the Canadian River) to Lexington (east side of the river) to be only three minutes by car, according to google maps. When the bridge was closed for emergency repairs, the same trip was 43 minutes when rerouted north to the nearest bridge, or one hour, four minutes when rerouted southeast to the nearest bridge.

The 1938 construction of this bridge enabled communities from West and Southwest (Byars, Cole, Dibble, Paoli, Pauls Valley, Purcell, Rosedale, and Wayne) side of the river to reach the communities on the East side of the river (Lexington, Slaughterville, and Wanette). Traffic using the bridge allows trade and commerce to freely flow in this retail trade area of southern McClain County, southern Cleveland County, Southern Pottawatomie County, and northern areas of Garvin County, and the eastern portion of Grady County. The bridge, rebuilt in 2019, features the same design elements with concrete post and wrought iron railings with protected turn lane and sidewalks.

According to the Oklahoma Department of Transportation, "History was made Friday July 26, 2019 in Purcell and Lexington, just as it was more than 80 years ago when the two cities celebrated the grand opening of a new bridge connecting their communities. The new US 77 Purcell/Lexington James C. Nance Bridge that links the twin cities, located less than one mile apart, fully opened to traffic with much fanfare on Friday, July 26, 2019, the culmination of a major two-year, expedited reconstruction project."

Communities

 Etowah
 Hall Park
 Lexington
 Moore
 Noble
 Norman (county seat)
 Oklahoma City (mostly in Oklahoma County)
 Purcell (mostly in McClain County)
 Slaughterville

NRHP sites

The following sites in Cleveland County are listed on the National Register of Historic Places:

 Bavinger House, Norman
 Beta Theta Pi Fraternity House, Norman
 Bizzell Library, Norman
 Casa Blanca, Norman
 Cleveland County Courthouse, Norman
 DeBarr Historic District, Norman
 Patricio Gimeno House, Norman
 Oscar B. Jacobson House, Norman
 Ledbetter House, Norman
 Mardock Mission, Stella
 Moore Public School Building, Moore
 Moore-Lindsay House, Norman
 Norman City Park New Deal Resources, Norman
 Norman Historic District, Norman
 Norman Public Library, Norman
 Boyd House (University of Oklahoma), Norman
 Santa Fe Depot, Norman
 Sooner Theater Building,
 United States Post Office--Norman, Norman
 James C. Nance Bridge, Lexington/Purcell

References

External links
 Encyclopedia of Oklahoma History and Culture - Cleveland County
 Oklahoma Digital Maps: Digital Collections of Oklahoma and Indian Territory

 
Oklahoma City metropolitan area
1890 establishments in Oklahoma Territory
Populated places established in 1890